Daniela Hantuchová and Ai Sugiyama were the defending champions but did not compete that year.

Jelena Janković and Li Na won in the final 6–2, 6–4 against Jill Craybas and Liezel Huber.

Seeds

Draw

Main draw

Qualifying draw

References
 2006 DFS Classic Draws
 ITF Tournament Page
 ITF doubles results page
 ITF doubles qualifying results page

DFS Classic - Doubles
Doubles